Marie Pietruschka (born 21 June 1995) is a German swimmer.

She competed in the 4×200 m freestyle relay event at the 2018 European Aquatics Championships, winning the bronze medal.

References

1995 births
Living people
German female swimmers
German female freestyle swimmers
European Aquatics Championships medalists in swimming
Swimmers at the 2020 Summer Olympics
Olympic swimmers of Germany
20th-century German women
21st-century German women